The 2012–13 A.S. Bari season is the 86th season in club history.

Review and events

Matches

Legend

Serie B

Coppa Italia

Squad

Squad, matches played and goals scored

Minutes played

Bookings

Sources

Bari
S.S.C. Bari seasons